The Subcommittee on the Constitution and Limited Government is one of six subcommittees of the United States House Committee on the Judiciary. Until 2019 it was called the Subcommittee on the Constitution and Civil Justice, and between 2019 and 2023, the Subcommittee on the Constitution, Civil Rights and Civil Liberties.

Jurisdiction
Constitutional rights, constitutional amendments, Federal civil rights, voting rights, claims against the United States, non-immigration private claims bills, ethics in government, tort liability, federal charters of incorporation, and other matters.

Members, 118th Congress

Historical membership rosters

115th Congress

116th Congress

See also
 United States Senate Judiciary Subcommittee on the Constitution, Civil Rights and Property Rights

References

External links 
 Subcommittee page

Judiciary House Constitution, Civil Rights, and Civil Liberties